Mongolism may refer to:

 Pan-Mongolism, an irredentist idea advocating the union of the contiguous territories inhabited by Mongols
 Mongolian idiocy, outdated term for Down syndrome
 Mongoloid, populations that show certain phenotypic traits

See also
 Mongolian nationalism (disambiguation)
Mongolian studies
 Mong (disambiguation)
 Mongo (disambiguation)
 Mongoloid (disambiguation)
 Mongols (disambiguation)